Asen's Fortress (Asenova krepost), identified by some researchers as Petrich (Петрич), is a medieval fortress in the Bulgarian Rhodope Mountains,  south of the town of Asenovgrad, on a high rocky ridge on the left bank of the Asenitsa River.

History
The earliest archaeological findings date from the time of the Thracians, the area of the fortress being also inhabited during the Ancient Roman and Early Byzantine period. The fortress gained importance in the Middle Ages, first mentioned in the statute of the Bachkovo Monastery as Petrich in the 11th century. The fortress was conquered by the armies of the Third Crusade.

It was considerably renovated in the 13th century (more precisely 1231) during the rule of Bulgarian tsar Ivan Asen II to serve as a border fortification against Latin raids, as evidenced by an eight-line wall inscription.

The best preserved and most notable feature of Asen's Fortress is the Church of the Holy Mother of God from the 12th-13th century. It is a two-storey cross-domed single-naved building with a wide narthex and a large rectangular tower, and features mural paintings from the 14th century. The conservation and partial restoration works on the church were finished in 1991 (the whole fortress was left to decay after the Ottoman conquest in the 14th century and only the church remained standing in its original appearance as it was used by the local Christians) and now it is in regular use as a Bulgarian Orthodox church.

Taken by the Byzantines after Ivan Asen II's death, the fortress was once again in Bulgarian hands at the time of Ivan Alexander in 1344 only to be conquered and destroyed by the Ottomans during their rule of Bulgaria.

The town of Asenovgrad takes its modern name from the fortress, formerly being named Stanimaka.

Gallery

References
 Asen's Fortress - website
 3D Virtual Tour - Click here

Asenovgrad
Castles in Bulgaria
Rhodope Mountains
Medieval Bulgarian Orthodox church buildings
Buildings and structures in Plovdiv Province
Tourist attractions in Plovdiv Province